The fifth USS Powhatan (YT-128) was a yard tug  that served in the United States Navy from 1938 to 1976. She was reclassified YTM-128 in 1944.

USS Powhatan (YT-128) was laid down on 28 March 1938 by the Boston Navy Yard, Boston, Massachusetts and launched o 10 June 1938. She was completed and delivered to the U.S. Navy on 16 September 1938.

Powhatan served at Newport, Rhode Island, from 1938 to 1958. She was reclassified YTM-128 on 15 May 1944. She was active at Naval Station Argentia, Newfoundland, from 1958 to 1963. In 1963 she began service in the 10th Naval District at San Juan, Puerto Rico, where she remained through at least 1970.

Her career from 1970 through 1976 requires further research.

Powhatan was sold for scrap in 1976, and was subsequently lost while under tow by USNS San Juan to a scrapper in the Carolinas.

References

External links
 Photo gallery at navsource.org

1938 ships
World War II auxiliary ships of the United States
Tugs of the United States Navy
Ships built in Boston